A ri or village is an administrative unit in both North Korea and South Korea.

See also
 Administrative divisions of North Korea
 Administrative divisions of South Korea

References